Plymouth Municipal Airport  is a public airport located in Plymouth, New Hampshire, three miles (5 km) north-west of the central business district of Plymouth, in Grafton County, New Hampshire, United States. It is included in the Federal Aviation Administration (FAA) National Plan of Integrated Airport Systems for 2017–2021, in which it is categorized as a local general aviation facility.

The airport is equipped with an AWOS III-PT which provides meteorological information to pilots and other interested parties.

See also
List of airports in New Hampshire

References

External links 

Airports in New Hampshire
Transportation buildings and structures in Grafton County, New Hampshire
Plymouth, New Hampshire